Magdalena Białas (born 1962) is a Polish backstroke and medley swimmer and Olympic medalist. She competed at the 1980 Summer Olympics in Moscow, where she placed 8th in 400 metre individual medley.

References

External links

1962 births
Living people
Polish female butterfly swimmers
Olympic swimmers of Poland
Swimmers at the 1980 Summer Olympics
Sportspeople from Kraków
Polish female medley swimmers